Thomas Christopher Arthur (born Christopher Thomas Arthur; 11 May 1883 – 6 June 1953) was an Australian politician. Born in Forbes, New South Wales, he received a primary education before becoming a miner and an official of the Miners' Federation. Later, he was an organiser with the Australian Workers' Union. In 1937, he was elected to the Australian Senate as a Labor Senator for New South Wales, forming one part of the "four A's" with Bill Ashley, Stan Amour and John Armstrong (the Labor Party had nominated four candidates with their surnames beginning with A to take advantage of alphabetical ordering on the Senate ticket). He lost Labor endorsement for the 1943 election but contested the Senate as an independent, winning only 0.5% of the vote. He left politics to become a public servant, and died in 1953.

References

Australian Labor Party members of the Parliament of Australia
Independent members of the Parliament of Australia
Members of the Australian Senate for New South Wales
Members of the Australian Senate
Australian trade unionists
1883 births
1953 deaths
20th-century Australian politicians